Oncotylus punctipes is a species of plant bugs belonging to the family Miridae, subfamily Phylinae. It is found in Benelux, Czech Republic,  Germany, France, Moldova, North Macedonia, Poland, Romania, Slovakia, Slovenia, Ukraine, and Scandinavia.

References

Insects described in 1875
Hemiptera of Europe
Phylini